Brâncoveneşti may refer to:

Craiovești, later known as Brâncoveneşti, a Romanian boyar family
Brâncovenești, Mureș, a commune in Mureș County, Romania

See also 
Brâncovenesc, an architectural style of 17th–18th century Romania
Brâncoveni, Oltenia, Romania
Brâncoveanu (disambiguation)